WRAP was an historic black-oriented radio station in Norfolk, Virginia, on the air from 1952 to 1989.  It served the Tidewater region, including Portsmouth, Newport News, Hampton and Virginia Beach.   It began as one of only a handful of American radio stations broadcasting full-time to the African American community, featuring R&B, soul music and black gospel, along with news and talk programs.

History

Early Years on AM 1050
WRAP premiered in September 1952. It joined a select few radio stations across the country that aimed to reach black audiences, including WDIA in Memphis, founded in 1948, WVON in Chicago and WERD in Atlanta, the first radio station to be owned by an African American. “Negro-oriented” radio stations, which later became known as black-oriented stations, featured mostly black DJs and targeted African American audiences with recordings by black artists and advertising aimed at black consumers.

The station began on AM 1050 and was a daytimer.  It broadcast at only 500 watts by day and had to sign-off at night to avoid interfering with clear-channel station XEG in Monterrey, Mexico.  Nearly all broadcast properties in that era, even black-oriented radio stations, were white-owned, including WRAP. WRAP was a subsidiary of Rollins Broadcasting, owned by local businessmen John W. Rollins, who served as president, and O. Wayne Rollins, the vice president.  It would be several decades before the Federal Communications Commission issued rules that encouraged minorities to own and operate broadcasting outlets.

The owners chose the call sign WRAP.  "Rap" is an African-American English word for "talk" or "discussion."   As early as 1953, a newspaper article described WRAP as “the only station in the Tidewater area of Virginia which beams its programs exclusively to a Negro audience.”   An early station slogan that appeared in newspaper advertisements declared that the station played the “Music That Belongs to America.”

Move to AM 850
In 1957, WRAP moved to AM 850.  The change in frequency allowed it to broadcast around the clock with more power, 5,000 watts by day and 1,000 watts at night.  An advertisement in the 1957 edition of Broadcasting Yearbook, using the descriptions of the era, said "Survey figures show the most Negroes in the Norfolk area listen most to WRAP." It added that WRAP, at 850 kilocycles, was "the only all-Negro station in Norfolk."

In December 1978, five African American WRAP DJs joined together and asked the station’s white management for raises.  They were summarily fired.  One of the DJs, Randy Williams, managed to issue an on-air “statement of solidarity” in protest of the firings before he was forced to leave the station.  The next month, “The WRAP Fired Five” organized a public rally to protest WRAP. They called for African Americans in the area to boycott the station, citing both the unfair firings and the management’s deeper insensitivity to the black community’s needs.

Switch to AM 1350
In 1986, a local cable television company, Clinton Cablevision, bought WRAP.  Two years later, the cable company changed it to WNIS, a news/talk station.  WRAP's call letters and R&B format moved to AM 1350 in nearby Portsmouth.  That station was owned by a Philadelphia-based black businessman, Ragan Henry, who also owned urban radio stations in Kansas City and Tampa.

In 1989, the station changed its ownership to Three Chiefs Broadcasting.  The call sign was switched to WBSK.  The WRAP call letters were sold to a North Carolina broadcaster.  Shortly thereafter, the new management at WBSK fired fifteen employees – many of them longtime WRAP personalities – without any warning. The WBSK management justified these actions by arguing that the staffers had not yet completed a 90-day probationary period they had started at the station and were thus subject to termination without notice.  The station switched to a gospel music format.

Format
WRAP aired a mix of music, Religious shows, black college football games, and programming for homemakers. It was best known for playing R&B and Rock 'N' Roll in the 1950s, and for its funk and soul hits in the 1960s and the 1970s, and then in the 1980s H.J. Ellison became the first deejay to host a show devoted to a new type of music called hip-hop in Afternoon Drive at WRAP.

Disc Jockeys
WRAP’s first three full-time black disc jockeys were Robert “Bob” King, Milton "Milt" Nixon, and Oliver Allen.

WRAP’s most popular deejay was Jackson “Big Daddy Jack” Holmes. Born in 1915 in Merchantville, New Jersey, outside Philadelphia, Jack began his radio career at WLOW in Portsmouth in September 1949.  Within a few years, Jack had developed a devoted following in the area. And then in the late 1950s Jack joined the WRAP staff and became their most prominent deejay.

Other popular deejays at WRAP over the years were Jay Dee Jackson, Frankie “The WRAP Soul Ranger” Stewart, Throckmortan "Gosh Oh Gee" Quiff, Maurice Ward, H.J. Ellison, William “Bill” Boykins, Chester Benton, Alvin Reaves, Calvin "Shakespeare" Perkins, with Calvin Cooke, and Leola Dyson. One of the first black female radio deejays in the country, Leola directed public relations for WRAP and performed on the air for more than twenty years.

Reunion
WRAP staffers came together for a reunion in 2003, organized by Chester Benton and Bill Boykins.

References 

1952 establishments in Virginia
1989 disestablishments in Virginia
Defunct radio stations in the United States
Radio stations disestablished in 1989
Radio stations established in 1952
RAP
RAP
Defunct religious radio stations in the United States
RAP